Khamis Harib is an Emirati former cyclist. He competed in the team time trial at the 1992 Summer Olympics.

References

External links
 

Year of birth missing (living people)
Living people
Emirati male cyclists
Olympic cyclists of the United Arab Emirates
Cyclists at the 1992 Summer Olympics
Place of birth missing (living people)